The 1916 Washington & Jefferson Red and Black football team represented Washington & Jefferson College as an independent during the 1916 college football season. Led by first-year head Sol Metzger, Washington & Jefferson compiled a record of 10–0–1.

Schedule

References

Washington and Jefferson
Washington & Jefferson Presidents football seasons
Washington and Jefferson Red and Black football